Adriaan Koerbagh (1633 – 1669) was a Dutch scholar and writer who was a critic of religion and conventional morality.

Life
Adriaan Koerbagh studied at the universities of respectively Utrecht, Franeker and Leiden, becoming a doctor in medicine in 1659 and master in jurisprudence in 1661.  He was one of the most radical figures of the Age of Enlightenment, rejecting and reviling the church and state as unreliable institutions and exposing theologians' and lawyers' language as vague and opaque tools to blind the people in order to maintain their own power.  Koerbagh put the authority of reason above that of dogmas and was thus seen as a true freethinker, although twentieth century notions of him as an anarchist or libertarian cannot be applied with certainty.

Koerbagh described the Bible and dogmas like the Trinity and the divine nature of Christ as only the work of men.  Also, like his contemporary Baruch de Spinoza, he argued that God is identical with nature and that nothing exists outside of nature. Therefore, he argued, natural science, not theology, was the real theology of the world.  In his views about the secularization of the Republic of the Netherlands and the limitation of ecclesiastical powers, he argued that religion is irrational and only maintains its position through deception and violence.

He wrote in books t Nieuw Woorden-Boeck der Regten (The New Dictionary of Rights, 1664), and in Een Bloemhof van allerley lieflijkheyd (A Flower Garden of All Sorts of Delights, 1668), under the pseudonym Vreederijk Waarmond.  This book explained various technical terms and foreign words. The Church authorities were offended by the dictionary's articles on religious and political topics, forcing Koerbagh to flee to Culemborg, a legally autonomous town in another province that would not extradite him, and then to Leiden.

Adriaan Koerbagh fiercely opposed the Dutch Reformed Church in his third work, "Een Ligt schynende in duystere plaatsen, om te verligten de voornaamste saaken der Godsgeleerdtheyd en Godsdienst" (A Light Shining In Dark Places, To Shed Light On Matters Of Theology and Religion).  He went to Leiden, where he was betrayed by his printer, who knew the contents of his work, and arrested by the authorities. His brother Johannes was also arrested.

In 1668, he was found guilty of blasphemy and was sentenced to 10 years in the Rasphuis jail at Amsterdam, where he had to do forced labour, followed by exile and a 4000 guilder fine. He died a few months later in 1669 in the Rasphuis due to the pressures of prison life.  His publications were largely destroyed by the authorities of the Republic.  His brother Johannes was released because of lack of evidence against him, but he never published again. He died three years later, in 1672.

Koerbagh's story shows that the tolerance of the Dutch Republic, however great compared with almost every other country in the world at the time, was certainly not unlimited.

Works
 't Nieuw-woordenboek der Regten (1664)
 Een Bloemhof van allerley lieflijkheyd sonder verdriet (1668)
 Een ligt Schijnende in Duystere Plaatsen, om te verligten de voornaamste saaken der Godsgeleerdtheyd en Godsdienst (1668, reissued 1974)

References

Sources
 Noordervliet, Nelleke: "Helden van het vrije woord", NRC Handelsblad, 18 June 2007.
 Israel, Jonathan I., Radical Enlightenment: Philosophy and the Making of Modernity 1650–1750; Oxford University Press, USA; 2002.

External links
 Adriaan Koerbagh, precursor of the Enlightenment?
 Biography in the Koninklijke Bibliotheek van Nederland
 Photograph of page from "Een Bloemhof" from the library of Frederick III of Denmark

1632 births
1669 deaths
Dutch people who died in prison custody
17th-century Dutch philosophers
Enlightenment philosophers
People convicted of blasphemy
Writers from Amsterdam
Prisoners who died in Dutch detention
Secularism
Dutch former Christians
People associated with Baruch Spinoza
Pantheism
Freethought